Kim Appleby is the debut solo album by English singer Kim Appleby, formerly one half of duo Mel and Kim. It features the singles "Don't Worry" (UK No. 2), "G.L.A.D" (UK No. 10), "Mama" (UK No. 19) and "If You Cared" (UK No. 44).

Following the death of her sister Mel in January 1990, with the aid of her then-boyfriend, ex-Bros bassist Craig Logan, Kim launched a solo career with much of the album composed of songs co-written with Mel, for what was intended to be the next Mel and Kim album.

Track listing
All tracks written by Kim Appleby, Craig Logan and Melanie Appleby, except where noted.

Charts

Certifications

References

1990 debut albums
Kim Appleby albums
Parlophone albums